The 2024 Indian general election in West Bengal is expected to be held in or before May 2024 to elect the 42 members of 18th Lok Sabha.

Parties and alliances







References

West Bengal
Indian general elections in West Bengal